Kampala Central Division is one of the five divisions that make up Kampala, the capital of Uganda.  The city's five divisions are:
(a) Kampala Central Division (b) Kawempe Division (c) Lubaga Division (d) Makindye Division and (e) Nakawa Division.

Location
The division comprises the central business district of the largest city in Uganda and includes the areas of Old Kampala, Nakasero and Kololo. These areas are the most upscale business and residential neighborhoods in the city. The division also incorporates low income neighborhoods including  Kamwookya, Kisenyi and Kampala's Industrial Area.  The coordinates of the division are:0°19'00.0"N, 32°35'00.0"E (Latitude:0.316667; Longitude:32.583333). The division comprises about 20 parishes. Some of the parishes include; Bukesa, Civic Centre, Industrial Area, Kagugube, Kamwokya I, Kamwokya II, Kisenyi I, Kisenyi II, Kisenyi III, Kololo, Mengo, Nakasero, Nakivubo, Old Kampala among others.

Overview
The Kampala Capital City Authority (KCCA), was established in 2011, replacing the defunct Kampala City Council (KCC). During the first three years the leaders of the new KCCA and of the Central division, have focused on improving sanitation and garbage disposal, preserving the environment and enforcing existing building and zoning laws. Having made progress during the first three years, the KCCA leadership is expected to shift focus to the  repair and widening of the roadways and streets in the division, as well as decongesting the city center.

See also

References

External links
  Central Division Suspends Trading License Collection
 Google Map of the Central Division of Kampala

 
Geography of Kampala
Populated places in Uganda